Moncton East is a provincial electoral district for the Legislative Assembly of New Brunswick, Canada.  It was first contested in the 2014 general election, having been created in the 2013 redistribution of electoral boundaries.

The district includes the northeasternmost parts of the city of Moncton, as well as neighbouring suburban communities northeast of Moncton, stretching into the edge of Kent County.

Though the district shares a name with an immediate predecessor, this district took in only 32% of the old district of Moncton East, the majority of which went to Moncton Centre where incumbent Chris Collins was elected.

Members of the Legislative Assembly

Election results 

|-

|-

References

External links 
Website of the Legislative Assembly of New Brunswick
Map of riding as of 2018

New Brunswick provincial electoral districts
Politics of Moncton